Sedapatti is a state assembly constituency in Madurai district in Tamil Nadu. Elections and Winners from this constituency are listed below. Elections were not held in year 1957 and 1962.

In 2008, under a Delimitation of Parliamentary and Assembly Constituency Order, the sedapatti assembly constituency was merged with Usilampatti constituency.

Madras State

Tamil Nadu

Election results

2006

2001

1996

1991

1989

1984

1980

1977

1971

1967

1952

References

External links
 

Former assembly constituencies of Tamil Nadu
Madurai district